Zacorisca erythromis is a species of moth of the family Tortricidae. It is found in the Maluku Islands of Indonesia, where it has been recorded from Buru.

The wingspan is 27–29 mm. The forewings are dark purple blue, with an oval orange-red blotch. The hindwings are dark purple blue.

References

	

Moths described in 1924
Zacorisca